Tomas Venclova (born 11 September 1937) is a Lithuanian poet, prose writer, scholar, philologist and translator of literature. He is one of the five founding members of the Lithuanian Helsinki Group. In 1977, following his dissident activities, he was forced to emigrate and was deprived of his Soviet citizenship. Since 1980, he has taught Russian and Polish literature at Yale University. Considered a major figure in world literature, he has received many awards, including the Prize of Two Nations (received jointly with Czesław Miłosz), and The Person of Tolerance of the Year Award from the Sugihara Foundation, among other honors.

Life
Tomas Venclova was born in Klaipėda in 1937. His father, Antanas, was a poet and Soviet politician. Tomas was educated at Vilnius University. He was one of the five founding members of the Lithuanian Helsinki Group, and took part in Lithuanian and Russian dissident movements. He became friends with poets Anna Akhmatova and Boris Pasternak, as well as Natalya Gorbanevskaya and Joseph Brodsky. In Vilnius, he translated Baudelaire, T.S. Eliot, W.H. Auden, Robert Frost, Osip Mandelstam, Anna Akhmatova, Boris Pasternak, and other authors into Lithuanian. In Lithuania he was forbidden to publish his own work, except in samizdat, although one volume appeared in 1972, entitled A Sign of Speech. In 1977, following his dissident activities, he was forced to emigrate.

He was invited by Czesław Miłosz to teach at the University of California at Berkeley. He did not return to Lithuania until its independence in 1991. Since 1980, he has taught Russian and Polish literature at Yale University.

He has published over twenty books including volumes of poetry, literary criticism, political commentary, literary biography, translation and books on Vilnius. His work has been translated into many languages including by Czesław Miłosz into Polish, and by Joseph Brodsky into Russian. He is active in the contemporary cultural life of Lithuania, and is one of its most well-respected figures.

He lives in New Haven (Connecticut, United States), in the past also temporarily in Vilnius and Kraków.

Selected honors and awards
 2018     Doctor Honoris Causa of Göttingen University (Germany)
 2017     Doctor Honoris Causa of Tbilisi University (Georgia)
 2017     Doctor Honoris Causa of Vilnius University  (Lithuania)
 2017     HOMER - The European Medal of Poetry and Art – (Tbilisi)
 2014     Petrarca-Prize  (Germany)
 2013     Honorary Citizen of Vilnius, Lithuania
 2012     Lithuanian Cultural Prize
 2012     Lithuanian Diplomacy Star from the Lithuanian Ministry of Foreign Affairs (for contributions to Lithuanian Human Rights)
 2012     Person of Tolerance of the Year Award, Sugihara-Diplomats for Life Foundation
 2011     Qinhai International Poetry Prize (China) 
 2008     Baltic Star (Russia)
 2007     Member, Polish Academy of Arts and Sciences (Umiejętności)
 2005     Jotvingiai Prize (Lithuania)
 2005     New Culture of New Europe Prize
 2002     Prize of Two Nations (received jointly with Czesław Miłosz)
 2001     Borderland Award (Poland)
 2000     Lithuanian National Prize
 1990     Vilenica International Literary Prize (Slovenia)

Selected bibliography

Books written in Lithuanian
 Visi eilėraščiai: 1956–2010. Collected Poems. Vilnius: Lietuvių literatūros ir tautosakos institutas, 2010. 404 p.
 Vilnius: asmeninė istorija. Vilnius: R. Paknio leidykla, 2011. 200 p. 
 Kitaip: poezijos vertimų rinktinė. Vilnius: Lietuvos rašytojų sąjungos leidykla, 2006. 432 p. 
 Vilniaus vardai. Vilnius: R. Paknio leidykla, 2006. 333 p.
 Sankirta: Eilėraščiai. Vilnius: Lietuvos rašytojų sąjungos leidykla, 2005. 80 p. 
 Ligi Lietuvos 10 000 kilometrų. Vilnius: Baltos lankos, 2003. 236 p.
 Vilnius: Vadovas po miestą. Vilnius: R. Paknio leidykla, 2001. 216 p.
 Manau, kad… Pokalbiai su Tomu Venclova. Vilnius: Baltos lankos, 2000. 320 p.
 Rinktinė. Vilnius: Baltos lankos, 1999. 216 p.
 Reginys iš alėjos: eilėraščiai. Vilnius: Baltos lankos, 1998. 64 p.
 Pašnekesys žiemą: eilėraščiai ir vertimai. Vilnius:  , 1991. 376 p.
 Vilties formos: eseistika ir publicistika. Vilnius: Lietuvos rašytojų sąjungos leidykla, 1991. 544 p.
 Tankėjanti šviesa: eilėraščiai. Chicago: Algimanto Mackaus knygų leidimo fondas, AM&M Publications, 1990. 72 p.
 Tekstai apie tekstus. Chicago: Algimanto Mackaus knygų leidimo fondas, 1985. 240 p.
 Lietuva pasaulyje: publicistika. Chicago: Akademinės skautijos leidykla, 1981. 292 p.
 98 eilėraščiai. Chicago: Algimanto Mackaus knygų leidimo fondas, 1977. 142 p.
 Kalbos ženklas: eilėraščiai. Vilnius: Vaga, 1972. 64 p.
 Golemas, arba dirbtinis žmogus: pokalbiai apie kibernetiką. Vilnius, 1965. 272 p.
 Raketos, planetos ir mes. Vilnius: Valstybinė grožinės literatūros leidykla, 1962. 168 p.
 Lietuvos istorija visiems, I tomas. Vilnius: R. Paknio leidykla, 2018, 336 p.
 Lietuvos istorija visiems, II tomas. Vilnius: R. Paknio leidykla, 2019, 380 p.* 
Books written in Russian
 Собеседники на пиру. Литературные эссе. Москва, НЛО, 2012, 624 с.
 Статьи о Бродском. Москва: Baltrus, Новое издательство, 2005. 176 с.
 Собеседники на пиру. Статьи о русской литературе. Vilnius: Baltos lankos,1997, 256 c. 
 Неустойчивое равновесие: восемь русских поэтических текстов. New Haven: YCIAS, 1986.
 
Books written in English
 Magnetic North: Conversations with Tomas Venclova (Rochester, N. Y.: University of Rochester Press, 2017).
 Aleksander Wat: Life and Art of an Iconoclast. New Haven and London: Yale University Press, 1996. 370 p.

Books in English translation
 Vilnius. A Personal History. The Sheep Meadow Press, 2009, 276 p.
 The Junction: Selected Poems. Edited by Ellen Hinsey. Bloodaxe Books, 2008. 
 Vilnius. Vilnius. R. Paknio leidykla, 2001. 216 p. 
 Forms of Hope: Essays. The Sheep Meadow Press, 1999 [paperback 2003], 286 p.
 Winter Dialogue. Northwestern University Press, 1997 [paperback 1999], 148 p.

Books in German translation
 Gespräch im Winter: Gedichte.  Frankfurt am Main: Suhrkamp Verlag, 2007
 Vilnius. Eine Stadt in Europa. Frankfurt am Main: Suhrkamp Verlag, 2006
 Vilnius: Stadtfuehrer. Vilnius: R. Paknio leidykla, 2002
 Guenter Grass, Czesław Miłosz, Wisława Szymborska, Tomas Venclova. Die Zukunft der Erinnerung. Goettingen: Steidl, 2001
 Vor der Tuer das Ende der Welt: Gedichte. Hamburg: Rospo Verlag, 2000

Books in Russian translation
 Metelinga: Стихотворения и не только / Пер. и сост. А. Герасимовой. — М.: Пробел-2000, Umka-Press, 2017.
 Вильнюс: город в Европе. Пер. с лит. Марии Чепайтите. СПб. Изд-во Ивана Лимбаха, 2012  
 Негатив белизны. Стихи разных лет/ На русском языке с параллельным литовским текстом. М.: Новое издательство, 2008
 Гранёный воздух. Стихотворения. Москва: ОГИ, Дом Юргиса Балтрушайтиса, 2002 
 Свобода и правда. Москва: Издательская группа «Прогресс», 1999

Books in Swedish translation
 Former av hopp: Essaer 1976–2001. Kristianstad: Ariel/Ellerstroms, 2001
 Samtal vintertid: Dikter 1956–2000. Satarod/Malmo: Ariel, 2000

Books in Polish translation
 Czesław Miłosz, Tomas Venclova, Powroty do Litwy. Returns to Lithuania. Warszawa: Zeszyty Literackie, 2011
 Z dzienników podróży. Warszawa: Zeszyty Literackie, 2010
 Opisać Wilno. Warszawa: Fundacja Zeszytów Literackich, 2006.
 Niezniszczalny rytm — eseje o literaturze. Pogranicze, 2002
 Wilno: Przewodnik. Vilnius: R. Paknio leidykla, 2001
 Rozmowa w zimie. Warszawa: Zeszyty Literackie, 2001 
 Eseje. Publicystyka. Pogranicze, 2001
 Aleksander Wat. Obrazoburca. Przeł. J. Goślicki. Kraków: Wydawnictwo Literackie, 1997
 Rozmowa w zimie. Paris-Kraków: Zeszyty Literackie-Oficyna Literacka, 1991 
 Sześć wierszy. Lublin: Wydawnictwo FIS, 1991
 Siedem wierszy. Warszawa: Wydawnictwo S, 1986
 Czesław Miłosz, Tomas Venclova, Dialog o Wilnie. Warszawa: Niezależna Oficyna Wydawnicza, 1981

Books in Hungarian Translation
 Vilnius egy város Európában (translated by Tölgyesi Beatrix). Budapest: Európa Könykviadó, 2009
 Litvánok és... . Budapest: Európa Könyvkiadó, 2003
 Mondjátok meg Fortinbrasnak. Budapest: Európa Könyvkiadó, 1992

Books in Ukrainian Translation
 Передчуття і пророцтва Східної Європи. Дух і літера, 2016

Books in Finnish translation
 Vilna: Kaupungin tarina. Tampere: Jagellonica-kulttuuriyhdistys ry, 2012

Books in Italian translation
 Cinquantuno poesie e una lettera (In forma di parole, 2003, No. 1 Bologna)

Books in Chinese translation
 Selected Poems. Xining: Qinghai Renmin Press, 2011

Books in Portuguese translation
 Literatura lituana (Sinopse). New York: Lithuanian National Foundation, Inc., 1979

Books in Slovenian translation
 Čistost soli. Ljubljana: Društvo slovenskih pisateljev, 1991

Books in Albanian translation
 Dialog ne dimer: Poezi te zgjedhura. Tirane: Aleph, 2005

References

External links
 Web of Stories, Tomas Venclova (video 1:11), part 1 of 88 (Lithuanian with English subtitles)
 Review of The Junction
 A selection of Venclova's poetry at Poetry Magazine
 About Tomas Venclova: Literaturfestival Berlin and DAAD Program
 Author's page at Bloodaxe Books: Author Page/Bloodaxe Books 
A guide to the Tomas Venclova Papers at the Beinecke Rare Book and Manuscript Library

1937 births
Living people
People from Klaipėda
Vilnius University alumni
Lithuanian philologists
Lithuanian essayists
Lithuanian writers
Lithuanian translators
Lithuanian male poets
Soviet emigrants to the United States
American people of Lithuanian descent
Soviet dissidents
Lithuanian Helsinki Group
University of California, Berkeley faculty
Yale University faculty
Recipients of the Lithuanian National Prize
Commander's Crosses of the Order of the Lithuanian Grand Duke Gediminas
Grand Crosses of the Order of Merit of the Republic of Poland
Soviet literary historians
Soviet male writers
20th-century male writers
Recipients of the Order of the Cross of Vytis
Knights of the Order of Vytautas the Great
People denaturalized by the Soviet Union
20th-century essayists